Rhopalolemma is a genus of cuckoo bees in the family Apidae. There are at least two described species in Rhopalolemma.

Species
These two species belong to the genus Rhopalolemma:
 Rhopalolemma robertsi Roig-Alsina, 1991
 Rhopalolemma rotundiceps Roig-Alsina, 1997

References

Further reading

 

Nomadinae
Articles created by Qbugbot